USS Western Star (ID-4210) was a cargo ship of the United States Navy that served during World War I and its immediate aftermath.

Construction and acquisition

SS Western Star was laid down as a steel-hulled, single-screw Design 1013 commercial cargo ship by J. F. Duthie and Company in Seattle, Washington, under a United States Shipping Board contract for the French Compagnie Générale. She was launched on 4 July 1918 and completed late in August 1918. Upon her completion, the Shipping Board transferred her immediately on 28 August 1918 to the U.S. Navy for use during World War I. The Navy assigned her the naval registry identification number 4210 and commissioned her at Seattle on 28 August 1918 as USS Western Star (ID-4210).

Navy career
Assigned to the Naval Overseas Transportation Service, Western Star departed Seattle and steamed to Union Bay, British Columbia, Canada, where she arrived on 5 September 1918. She loaded a cargo of coal and underwent a thorough search for bombs and other explosives before departing Union Bay on 15 September 1918 bound for Iquique, Chile. Arriving at Iquique on 13 October 1918, she unloaded her cargo, then moved to Caleta Buena, Chile, where she loaded a cargo of nitrates.

Departing Caleta Buena on 4 November 1918, Western Star steamed via the Panama Canal to Savannah, Georgia, arriving there on 5 December 1918. After unloading the nitrates there, she proceeded to Tompkinsville, Staten Island, New York, arriving on 31 December 1918.

Decommissioning and disposal

Western Star remained at Tompkinsville until 1 March 1919, when she was decommissioned and simultaneously transferred back to the U.S. Shipping Board.

Later career
Once again SS Western Star, the ship remained in Shipping Board custody until abandoned in 1933.

Notes

References

NavSource Online: Section Patrol Craft Photo Archive Western Star (ID 4210)

Design 1013 ships of the United States Navy
World War I cargo ships of the United States
Ships built by J. F. Duthie & Company
1918 ships